Sabrosa is a city and a municipality in northern Portugal. It may also refer to:

"Sabrosa", a song by the Beastie Boys from the album Ill Communication
"Sabrosa", a song by Scale the Summit from the album The Migration
Luciano Sabrosa (born 1979), Brazilian footballer
Simão Sabrosa (born 1979), Portuguese footballer

Portuguese-language surnames